Judaicus may refer to :

The Fiscus Iudaicus was a tax imposed on Jews by the Roman Empire after the destruction of the Temple of Jerusalem in 70 CE.
Oedipus Judaicus by William Drummond was first published in 1811 to a limited release of 200 copies.